Chris Kidd (born November 23, 1979) is an American politician who has served in the Oklahoma Senate from the 31st district since 2016.

References

1979 births
Living people
Republican Party Oklahoma state senators
21st-century American politicians